Bragino is a rural locality (a village) in Nikolotorzhskoye Rural Settlement, Kirillovsky District, Vologda Oblast, Russia. The population was 18 as of 2002.

Geography 
Bragino is located 31 km northeast of Kirillov (the district's administrative centre) by road. Levkovo is the nearest rural locality.

References 

Rural localities in Kirillovsky District